Ashlyne Anderson Huff (born August 28, 1985) is an American singer, songwriter and dancer. She is the daughter of Nashville record producer and session-guitarist Dann Huff, the granddaughter of Nashville arranger Ron Huff and the niece of Giant and White Heart drummer David Huff.

Early life 
As a child Huff took dance lessons and musical classes. Huff won an award at the Actors, Models and Talent for Christ (AMTC) 2004 Winter Convention in the category 'Overall Dancer'. She then headed to the Belmont University and enrolled in the Belmont University Music Business program where she studied publishing and copyright law. During her studies at the university Huff continued working on her own music. Huff is a graduate of Belmont University.

Career 
She was the opening act alongside Just Kait for Honor Society on their Spring 2010 Here Comes Trouble Tour. She has also toured with Emily Osment.

Her self-titled album was released May 11, 2010 by Liquid Digital Media. She wrote or co-wrote every song on the album. She was the featured performer at Liquid's awards dinner on May 17, 2010.

Her song "Heart of Gold" is offered as a bonus track with the compilation album Now That's What I Call Music! featuring Daughtry, Kris Allen and Adam Lambert.

In the summer of 2010, she embarked on selected dates of Jordin Sparks' "Battlefield Tour" as opening act alongside Days Difference.

The following summer, in 2011, Ashlyne joined the New Kids on the Block and the Backstreet Boys as an opening act on the NKOTBSB Tour.

In 2015 she published the book Falling Stars.

Discography

Studio albums

Singles

References

1985 births
Living people
American female dancers
Dancers from California
Belmont University alumni
Singers from California
Musicians from Glendale, California
21st-century American singers
21st-century American women singers